Jbeil may refer to:

 Byblos, the Greek name for a city in modern-day Lebanon known by its Arabic name Jbeil
 Byblos District, the district surrounding Byblos
 Bint Jbeil ("daughter of Byblos"), town in Lebanon
 Smar Jbeil, town in Lebanon